Yemei ha-tom (Hebrew: ימי התום - The Days of Innocence) is Israeli singer Rita's second album.  The album was released in 1988 and was certified gold five times, with many songs reaching the top of the charts in Israel. The biggest hit from this album was "Ani Khaya Li Mi'Yom LeYom" ("I Live from Day to Day"). The album also included a Hebrew vocal interpretation of Joaquin Rodrigo's Concierto de Aranjuez entitled "Shir HaQeshet" ("Song of the Rainbow").

Track listing
 בוא (Bo) [Come]
 חברה (Khavera) [A Girlfriend]
 עטוף ברחמים ('At'uf BeRakhamim) [Wrapped in Mercy]
 אני חיה לי מיום ליום (Ani Khaya Li MiYom LeYom) [I Live from Day to Day]
 שיר לילדים החדשים (Shir LaYeladim HaKhadashim) [A Song for the New Children]
 נוצה ברוח (Notza BaRuakh) [A Feather in the Wind]
 כמו בתמונה (Kmo BiTmuna) [Like in the Photo]
 הנסיכה והרוח (HaNesikha VeHaRuakh) [The Princess and the Wind]
 שיר הקשת (Shir haQeshet) [The rainbow song]
 ימי התום (Yemey HaTom) [The Days of Innocence]
 העלמות האסורה (He'almut HaAsura) [A forbidden disappearance]

References

1988 albums
Rita (Israeli singer) albums